Albert W. Pettit (October 18, 1930 – June 5, 1997) is a former Republican member of the Pennsylvania House of Representatives.

References

Republican Party members of the Pennsylvania House of Representatives
1930 births
1997 deaths
20th-century American politicians